The 1993 Winter Universiade, the XVI Winter Universiade, took place in Zakopane, Poland.

1993
Universiade
Universiade
Universiade 1993
Sports competitions in Zakopane
Multi-sport events in Poland
Winter Universiade
Winter sports competitions in Poland